The Newfoundland and Labrador Challenge Cup, known as the Johnson Insurance Challenge Cup for sponsorship reasons, is the premier senior men's soccer league in the Canadian province of Newfoundland and Labrador. The competition is held annually from May until September and is governed and organized by the Newfoundland and Labrador Soccer Association. It is a tier 5 league in the Canadian soccer pyramid, and as a result the winning club qualifies to compete for the Challenge Trophy as the representative for Newfoundland and Labrador in October of each year. The St. Lawrence Laurentians and Holy Cross have traditionally dominated the competition, having won a combined total of 47 Cups out of the 55 times that it has been contested.

Competition format
The Newfoundland Challenge Cup consists of Newfoundland and Labrador-based men's senior amateur soccer clubs. The teams first compete to qualify for a playoff round in a league format, usually a quadruple- or hextuple-round robin system, depending on the number of clubs competing. Normally teams play around 20 league matches in a single season. At the end of the league phase the 4 clubs with the most points qualify for the playoffs (3 points are awarded for a win, 1 point is awarded for a draw, and none for a loss). Clubs are ranked by total points, then head-to-head record, then goal differential and then goals scored. If two clubs are still tied for a playoff position then a penalty kick competition at a venue decided by the league will determine the ranking. If three or more clubs are still tied the ranking will be determined by the drawing of lots.

The playoff round of the NLCC uses a Page playoff format, which was reinstituted in 2015 after the league switched to a more typical two round format in 2011. The competition takes place at one location over Labour Day weekend each year. The winner of the final qualifies for the Canadian National Challenge Cup as the representative for Newfoundland and Labrador.

Champions

All-NFLD Series / J.V. Rabbits Trophy
 1950 Holy Cross FC
 1951 St. Lawrence Laurentians
 1952 St. Lawrence Laurentians
 1953 St. John's All-Stars
 1954 Corner Brook All-Stars
 1955 St. Lawrence Laurentians
 1956 Corner Brook
 1957 St. John's Guards
 1958 St. John's Guards
 1959 St. John's Guards
 1960 Grand Bank GeeBees
All-NFLD Series
 1961 Corner Brook Royals
 1962 Corner Brook Royals
 1963 St. John's St. Pat's
 1964 Grand Bank GeeBees
 1965 St. John's Guards
 1966 St. Lawrence Laurentians
Newfoundland Labrador Cup
 1967 St. Lawrence Laurentians
 1968 St. Lawrence Laurentians
 1969 Feildians AA of St. John's
 1970 Grand Bank Gee Bees
 1971 St. Lawrence Laurentians
 1972 St. Lawrence Laurentians
 1973 Holy Cross FC
 1974 Grand Bank Gee Bees

 1975 St. Lawrence Laurentians
 1976 St. Lawrence Laurentians
 1977 St. Lawrence Laurentians
 1978 St. Lawrence Laurentians
 1979 Holy Cross FC
 1980 St. Lawrence Laurentians
 1981 Holy Cross FC
 1982 St. Lawrence Laurentians
 1983 Holy Cross FC
 1984 Holy Cross FC
 1985 Holy Cross FC
 1986 Holy Cross FC
 1987 Lawn Shamrocks
 1988 Holy Cross FC
 1989 Holy Cross FC
 1990 Burin Eagles
 1991 Burin Eagles
 1992 Holy Cross FC
 1993 St. Lawrence Laurentians
 1994 Holy Cross FC
 1995 St. Lawrence Laurentians
 1996 St. Lawrence Laurentians
 1997 St. Lawrence Laurentians
 1998 St. Lawrence Laurentians
 1999 St. Lawrence Laurentians

 2000 St. Lawrence Laurentians
 2001 St. Lawrence Laurentians
 2002 St. Lawrence Laurentians
 2003 Mount Pearl FC
 2004 Marystown United
 2005 St. Lawrence Laurentians
 2006 St. Lawrence Laurentians
 2007 St. Lawrence Laurentians
 2008 St. Lawrence Laurentians
 2009 Holy Cross FC
 2010 Holy Cross FC
 2011 Holy Cross FC
 2012 Holy Cross FC
 2013 St. Lawrence Laurentians
 2014 Holy Cross FC
 2015 Holy Cross FC
 2016 St. Lawrence Laurentians
 2017 Holy Cross FC
 2018 Holy Cross FC
 2019 Holy Cross FC
 2020 Holy Cross FC
 2021 Feildians AA St. John's
 2022 Holy Cross FC

Titles
Clubs in bold currently compete in the Challenge Cup.

Recent seasons

2017

Standings

2016

Standings

Playoffs

2015

Standings

Playoffs

2014

Standings

Playoffs

2013

Standings

Playoffs

2012

Standings

Playoffs

2011

Standings

Playoffs

2010

Standings

Playoffs

2004
In 2004 Marystown United were the Newfoundland and Labrador Challenge Cup Champions,. They went on to play in the 2004 Canadian National Challenge Cup finishing 8th.

1999
In 1999, Marystown United lost the Newfoundland and Labrador Challenge Cup 2-1 to St. Lawrence Laurentians.

Canadian Challenge Trophy
This is a list of Newfoundland clubs who have reached the finals at the annual Canadian Challenge Trophy tournament, which features the best senior men's amateur clubs from each province in Canada. Holy Cross FC are currently the only Newfoundland club to ever become national champions.

Bold indicates a current Challenge Cup teamItalics indicate a runner-up finish

References

External links
 
 

Soccer in Newfoundland and Labrador
Soccer cup competitions in Canada
1967 establishments in Newfoundland and Labrador
Recurring sporting events established in 1967